Fabrice Ougier (born 26 July 1971) is a French freestyle skier. He competed in the men's moguls event at the 1998 Winter Olympics.

References

1971 births
Living people
French male freestyle skiers
Olympic freestyle skiers of France
Freestyle skiers at the 1998 Winter Olympics
Sportspeople from Chambéry